Jeff Babcock (born March 7, 1980) is an American professional stock car racing driver. He last competed part-time in the NASCAR Camping World Truck Series, driving the No. 84 for Best Performance Motorsports.

Motorsports career results

NASCAR
(key) (Bold – Pole position awarded by qualifying time. Italics – Pole position earned by points standings or practice time. * – Most laps led.)

Camping World Truck Series

References

External links
 

1980 births
Living people
NASCAR drivers
People from Wayne, Ohio
Racing drivers from Ohio